Mombercelli is a comune (municipality) in the Province of Asti in the Italian region Piedmont, located about  southeast of Turin and about  southeast of Asti.

Mombercelli borders the following municipalities: Belveglio, Castelnuovo Calcea, Montaldo Scarampi, Montegrosso d'Asti, Rocca d'Arazzo, Rocchetta Tanaro, and Vinchio. It is located on a hill that is a local center of wine production.

Twin towns — sister cities
Mombercelli is twinned with:

  Villedieu-sur-Indre, France

References

External links
 Official website

Cities and towns in Piedmont